Shinada is a Japanese surname. Notable people with the surname include:

, Japanese bobsledder
, Japanese footballer

Japanese-language surnames